Varakkal Mullakoya (1840 - 1932), honorific Thangal, born Abd ur-Rahman Mullakoya, was an Islamic scholar from Calicut (now Kozhikode) in Malabar District, Madras Presidency.

Mullakoya Thangal was employed in service of the Arakkal Royal family of Cannanore. He also maintained healthy contacts with the British officials posted to Malabar District. He co-founded the Samastha Kerala Jamiyyathul Ulama, the principal Sunni-Shafi'i scholarly body in northern Kerala, in 1926.

Life and career 
Varakkal Mullakoya was born at Puthiyangadi, Calicut in 1840 to Sayyid Muhammed Ba-Alawi and Marakkarathu Sherifa Cheriya Beevi in a prosperous Yemeni-origin sayyid (thangal) family. He married twice, first Zainaba Koyyamma Beevi, and after her death, and to Fatima Beevi.

The thangal was educated in Arabic, Persian (Farsi) and Urdu. He also learned English from the British officials employed in Calicut.

Formation of the Samastha 
Mullakoya Thangal served as the founding president of Samastha Kerala Jamiyyathul Ulama, the principal Sunni-Shafi'i scholarly body in northern Kerala (1926). He occupied this position until his death on 16 December 1932.

References

Indian Islamic religious leaders
People from Kozhikode district
1932 deaths
Kerala Sunni-Shafi'i scholars
1840 births